This article covers euro gold and silver coins issued by the Royal Spanish Mint. It also covers rare cases of collectors coins (coins not planned for normal circulation) minted using other precious metals.  This article however, does not cover either the Spanish €2 commemorative coins or the Spanish peseta commemorative coins.

Other countries' euro gold and silver collections are discussed in the article Euro gold and silver commemorative coins.

Royal Spanish Mint

The Royal Spanish Mint is a public business entity, Its production of the coins takes place in two industrial plants, one in Madrid and the other in Burgos.

Program

2000-peseta
Silver 2000-peseta coins have been minted every year since 1994.
Each year a €12 silver coin is released to continue this tradition in the new currency.
The first of such was in 2002 celebrating Spain's presidency of the E.U.

The Iberoamerican Series
Each of the participating countries issues a sister coin dedicated to a particular theme.
Each coin also depicts the coat of arms of the other countries.
The participants are Argentina, Cuba, Ecuador, Guatemala, Mexico, Nicaragua, Paraguay, Peru & Portugal.
In 2003 the 5th series was released the theme was "Sailing", this was later followed by the 6th series in 2005 with "Architecture and Monuments" being the theme.

Future Projection
Although not yet approved by the corresponding ministerial orders, the 7th Iberoamerican series has been previewed by the Spanish Mint the theme is to be "Iberian-American countries and Olympic sports".

2002

Gold

Silver

2003

Gold

Silver

2004

Gold

Silver

2005

Mixed

Gold

Silver

2006

Mixed

Gold

Silver

2007

Gold

Silver

2008

Silver

Notes

References

 

Spain
Coins of Spain